Dirkje "Dicky" van Ekris (3 September 1932 – 8 January 2017) was a Dutch swimmer. She competed in the 100 m backstroke at the 1948 Olympics and finished in sixth place.

She played water polo water polo at HZC de Robben. From 1948 to 2010, she was a swimming teacher.

References

1932 births
2017 deaths
Dutch female backstroke swimmers
Olympic swimmers of the Netherlands
Swimmers at the 1948 Summer Olympics
Sportspeople from Hilversum
20th-century Dutch women